Dodds is a surname, and may refer to:

People

In academia
Sir Edward Charles Dodds, 1st Baronet, British biochemist
J. Colin Dodds, academic
E. R. Dodds, Irish classical scholar
Harold W. Dodds, American educator
Klaus Dodds, geographer
Stephen Hatfield Dodds, Australian philosophical economist

In arts and entertainment
Baby Dodds (1898–1959), American jazz drummer
Christopher Dodds, (born 1967), Canadian Photographer
Joanie Dodds, runner-up of America's Next Top Model, Cycle 6
Johnny Dodds, American jazz clarinettist
K. K. Dodds (born 1965), American actor
Megan Dodds (born 1970), British actor

In government and politics
Anneliese Dodds (born 1978), British politician
Diane Dodds (born 1958), Northern Ireland politician
Douglas Dodds-Parker (1909–2006), British politician
Francis H. Dodds (1858–1940), American politician
John Stokell Dodds (1848–1914), colonial administrator in Australia
Nigel Dodds (born 1958), Northern Ireland politician
Norman Dodds (1903–1965), British politician
Ozro J. Dodds (1840–1882), American politician

In sport

Football (soccer)
Billy Dodds (born 1969), Scottish footballer
Davie Dodds, Scottish footballer
Jock Dodds (1915–2007), Scottish footballer
Louis Dodds (born 1986), English footballer
Rhian Dodds (born 1979), Scottish-Canadian footballer

Other sports
David John Dodds, athlete and jockey
Jennifer Dodds (born 1991), Scottish curler
John Dodds (motorcycle racer) (born 1943), Australian motorcycle road racer
Mitchell Dodds (born 1989), Australian Rugby League player
Norman Dodds (1876–1916), Australian cricketer
Rachael Dodds (born 1994), Australian para-athlete
Richard Dodds (born 1959), British field hockey player
Trevor Dodds (born 1959), Namibian golfer
Trevor Dodds (curler), Scottish curler
Andrew Dodds (born 1991), Australian Figure Skater/Ice Dancer

In other fields
Alfred Dodds, French general
Isaac Dodds, British pioneer locomotive designer
Jackson Dodds, Canadian scouting organiser
John Mathieson Dodds, Scottish electrical engineer
Leslie Dodds, English bridge player
Lin Hatfield Dodds, Australian social activist (also see Stephen Hatfield Dodds)
Philip V.W. Dodds (1951–2007), audio engineer
W. O. H. Dodds, Canadian WW1 general

Other uses
Sandman (Wesley Dodds), a fictional character in the DC Comics universe
DS Dodds played by Jason Watkins in the British crime drama television series McDonald & Dodds

See also
Dodd (surname) 
Dodds (disambiguation)

English-language surnames